Dieffenbach may refer to:

 People
 Dieffenbach (surname)

 Places
 Dieffenbach-au-Val (Diefenbach im Tal), Bas-Rhin, France
 Dieffenbach-lès-Wœrth, Bas-Rhin, France

See also 
 Diefenbach, Germany
 Diffembach-lès-Hellimer (Diefenbach), Moselle, France
 Diffenbach-lès-Puttelange (Diefenbach), Moselle, France